Guyana Olympic Committee (IOC code: GUY) is the National Olympic Committee representing Guyana.

See also
Guyana at the Olympics
Guyana at the Commonwealth Games

External links 
Guyana at Olympic.org

Guyana
Guyana
Olympic
Guyana at the Olympics
1935 establishments in British Guiana
Sports organizations established in 1935